David Simmons may refer to:

Politicians 
 David Simmons (judge) (born 1940), politician and Chief Justice of Barbados
 David Simmons (Australian politician) (born 1947), former member of the Australian House of Representatives
 David H. Simmons (born 1952), American politician in Florida

Sports 
 David Simmons (rugby league) (born 1984), Australian rugby league player
 Dave Simmons (basketball, born 1959), American basketball head coach for McNeese State University men's basketball team
 Dave Simmons (basketball, born 1963), American basketball player who played majority of career in the Australian NBL
 Dave Simmons (footballer) (1948–2007), English footballer
 Dave Simmons (linebacker, born 1943), American football player for the St. Louis Cardinals, New Orleans Saints, and Dallas Cowboys
 Dave Simmons (linebacker, born 1957), American football player for the Green Bay Packers, Detroit Lions, Baltimore Colts and Chicago Bears
 David Simmons (rower) (born 1955), New Zealand representative rower

Other
 David Simmons (ethnologist) (1930–2015), New Zealand ethnologist, historian and author
 Dave Simmons (UK disc jockey), BBC Radio London and later journalist with US Worldwide Television News and Associated Press Television News

See also
David Simons (disambiguation)